Joan Benham (17 May 1918 – 13 June 1981) was an English actress best known for her portrayal of Lady Prudence Fairfax in the ITV period drama series Upstairs, Downstairs. She was born in London and was the first cousin of Hollywood actress Olive Sturgess.

Although her career mostly centred on television, Benham began her career appearing on the West End stage in the 1940s and continued to appear on the London stage periodically throughout her career. She appeared on Broadway as Helena in the 1954 revival of William Shakespeare's A Midsummer Night's Dream opposite Patrick Macnee as Demetrius.

Joan Benham appeared in sixteen episodes of Upstairs, Downstairs, from the first to the last series, as a Bellamy family friend, Lady Prudence Fairfax. Another London Weekend Television role for her saw her appear as Lady Loftus in the comedies Doctor in the House, Doctor in Charge and Doctor on the Go.

Other television programmes she appeared in include, Mrs Thursday, Father Brown, The Duchess of Duke Street, Just William and Take My Wife. Her film credits include the Miss Marple movie Murder Ahoy! (1964), Ladies Who Do (1963), Perfect Friday (1970) and Carry On Emmannuelle (1978).

Her last role was as Melinda Spry in the sitcom Terry and June. This episode, The Lawnmower, was broadcast on 13 November 1981, exactly five months after the day she had died, in Westminster, London, aged 63.

Selected filmography

 The Divorce of Lady X (1938) – Wearing a blue gown with a large crystal necklace (uncredited)
 Maytime in Mayfair (1949) – Fashion Editor (uncredited)
 Saturday Island (1952) – Nurse
 Mother Riley Meets the Vampire (1952) – Lady at Police Station (uncredited)
 The Pickwick Papers (1952) – (uncredited)
 Innocents in Paris (1953) – Receptionist (uncredited)
 Dance, Little Lady (1954) – (uncredited)
 The Man Who Loved Redheads (1955) – Chloe
 King's Rhapsody (1955) – Countess Astrid
 Child in the House (1956) – Vera McNally
 Loser Takes All (1956) – Miss Bullen (uncredited)
 Dry Rot (1956) – Blonde
 It's Great to Be Young (1956) – Mr. Routledge's Companion (uncredited)
 A Night to Remember (1958) – Lottie (uncredited)
 The Whole Truth (1958) – Party Guest
 The Heart of a Man (1959) – Grace (uncredited)
 The Crowning Touch (1959) – Daphne
 The Bridal Path (1959) – Barmaid
 Desert Mice (1959) – Una O'Toole
 The Grass Is Greener (1960) – Hairdresser's Receptionist (uncredited)
 I Thank a Fool (1962) – Restaurant Manager
 The V.I.P.s (1963) – Miss Potter
 Tamahine (1963) – Mrs. O'Shaugnessy
 Ladies Who Do (1963) – Miss Pinsent
 Murder Ahoy! (1964) – Matron Alice Fanbraid
 The Wild Affair (1964) – Assistant
 The Limbo Line (1968) – Lady Faraday
 Arthur? Arthur! (1969) – Mrs. Payne
 The Magic Christian (1969) – Socialite in Sotheby's
 Perfect Friday (1970) – Miss Welsh
 Tales of Beatrix Potter (1971) – Nurse
 Hardcore (1977) – Norma Blackhurst
 Rosie Dixon – Night Nurse (1978) – Sister Tutor
 The Greek Tycoon (1978) – Lady Allison
 Carry On Emmannuelle (1978) – Cynical Lady

References

External links
 

1918 births
1981 deaths
English television actresses
English film actresses
Actresses from London
20th-century English actresses